Diochus is a genus of beetles belonging to the family Staphylinidae.

The genus has cosmopolitan distribution.

Species

Species:

Diochus adisi 
Diochus amazonensis 
Diochus ampullaceus 
Diochus schaumi

References

Staphylininae
Staphylinidae genera